Align Biopharma is an initiative by six of the largest global pharmaceutical companies to create standards for physicians to access information on drugs. 

The companies participating include Allergan, AstraZeneca, Biogen, GlaxoSmithKline, Novartis and Pfizer, and the software company Veeva Systems. The group is led by vice presidents and technology officers from each participating company.

It was created to address the expansion of personalized medicine and specialized drugs, which are not frequently prescribed and tailored prescribing information is needed for each patient. The stated goals of Align are to allow physicians to use a single login to access pharmaceutical information for all six companies, and create a standard for consenting to receive information from pharmaceutical companies. Currently, companies individually verify the health care credentials of each provider before allowing them access to information.

References 

Pharmaceutical industry